Nikolaos M. Levidis, born 25 August 1868, date of death unknown) was a Greek shooter in the 1896 Summer Olympics and in the 1912 Summer Olympics. He was born in Corfu.

Levidis competed at the 1896 Summer Olympics in Athens in the free rifle event. His place and score in the event are not known, though he did not finish in the top five. Sixteen years later at the 1912 Summer Olympics he participated in the following events:

 300 metre military rifle, three positions - fourth place
 Team 25 metre small-bore rifle - fourth place
 Team 50 metre small-bore rifle - fifth place
 Team military rifle - seventh place
 100 metre running deer, single shots - 15th place
 25 metre small-bore rifle - 30th place
 30 metre dueling pistol - 34th place
 600 metre free rifle - 52nd place

References

External links

1868 births
Year of death missing
Greek male sport shooters
ISSF rifle shooters
ISSF pistol shooters
Running target shooters
Olympic shooters of Greece
Shooters at the 1896 Summer Olympics
19th-century sportsmen
Shooters at the 1912 Summer Olympics
Place of death missing
Sportspeople from Corfu